Kheira Hamraoui (born 13 January 1990) is a French professional footballer who plays as a midfielder for Division 1 Féminine club Paris Saint-Germain and the France national team.

Club career

Youth career 
Hamraoui began her football career with Clairefontaine, a renowned football academy for female French youth players.

Division 1 Féminine 
Hamraoui has played the majority of her career in the Division 1 Féminine, for clubs including Hénin-Beaumont, Saint-Étienne, and PSG. At Saint-Étienne, she was a crucial part of the club's first and only major title win, the 2011 Challenge de France.

Hamraoui signed for Lyon from PSG in 2016 after spending four years with the club. It was here that she won two continental trebles by winning the Champions League twice, winning the Coupe de France Féminine twice, and finishing first in the Division 1 Féminine for two consecutive seasons. In June 2018, she announced her departure from the French league and that she was looking for a new opportunity abroad.

2018–21: Barcelona 
She left Lyon in 2018 to sign a two-year contract with Barcelona, her first club venture outside of France.

In her first season with the club, she helped them progress to the semifinals of the UEFA Women's Champions League for the first time. They played Bayern, and Hamraoui bagged an important away goal in the first leg with a low shot to the bottom left corner. In the return leg at the Mini Estadi, Barcelona increased their aggregate score after a goal scored from a penalty, but Hamraoui found herself getting sent off after receiving a second yellow card. Barcelona won 2–0 on aggregate to advance to their first ever UWCL final, but Hamraoui was suspended and was not able to play against her former club. Lyon won the final 4–1. 

In her last season with the club, she won the historic treble of Primera División, Champions League and Copa de la Reina.

On 24 June 2021, she announced she was leaving Barcelona, stating on Twitter that "I've reached ALL my objectives with Barcelona... My mission here is over. A new adventure begins."

2021–present: Return to Paris Saint-Germain 
On 15 July, Hamraoui signed a two-year deal with Paris Saint-Germain.

International career
In October 2012 Hamraoui made her debut for the France national team in a friendly game against England.

She was part of the France squad at the 2015 FIFA Women's World Cup and the 2016 Olympics.

Hamraoui has not received a national team call-up since April 2019 and was not selected to the France squad at the 2019 FIFA Women's World Cup.

Assault incident 
On 4 November 2021, Hamraoui was assaulted in the street after two masked men dragged her from a club-issued car, assaulting her with iron bars. Her teammate Aminata Diallo, who was driving the car, was arrested following the incident; she was later released from police custody without any charges. During the attack, the masked men who assaulted Hamraoui were reported to have said "so like that, [you] sleep with married men?" On 19 November, Eric Abidal's wife Hayet announced that she had filed for divorce after it came to light that he was having an affair with Hamraoui. However, after further investigation, Diallo was re-arrested in September 2022 on charges of serious bodily harm.

Career statistics

International

Scores and results list France's goal tally first, score column indicates score after each Hamraoui goal.

Honours
Saint-Étienne
Coupe de France Féminine: 2011

Paris Saint-Germain
Coupe de France Féminine: runners-up, 2014

Lyon
Division 1 Féminine: 2016–17, 2017–18
UEFA Women's Champions League: 2016–17, 2017–18
Coupe de France Féminine: 2017

Barcelona
Primera División: 2019–20, 2020–21
UEFA Women's Champions League: 2020–21, runners-up: 2018–19
Copa de la Reina: 2020, 2021
Supercopa de España Femenina: 2020
Copa Catalunya: 2019
Cyprus Cup: 2014

Individual
UEFA Women's Champions League Squad of the Season: 2019–20

References

External links
 
 

1990 births
Living people
People from Croix, Nord
French women's footballers
France women's youth international footballers
France women's international footballers
French expatriate sportspeople in Spain
Expatriate women's footballers in Spain
Paris Saint-Germain Féminine players
AS Saint-Étienne (women) players
CNFE Clairefontaine players
Olympique Lyonnais Féminin players
Women's association football midfielders
2015 FIFA Women's World Cup players
French sportspeople of Algerian descent
Footballers at the 2016 Summer Olympics
Olympic footballers of France
Division 1 Féminine players
Sportspeople from Nord (French department)
FC Barcelona Femení players
Primera División (women) players
Footballers from Hauts-de-France
FCF Hénin-Beaumont players